Herbert Breiter Leonard (October 8, 1922 – October 14, 2006) was an American producer and writer. Leonard was a production manager at Screen Gems for many years.

Leonard produced and was the production manager for many of the television shows produced for Screen Gems which included The Adventures of Rin Tin Tin, Circus Boy, Naked City, and Route 66.

Early life

Herbert Breiter Leonard was born on October 8, 1922 in New York, New York, the youngest of two sons of Morton and Rhoda Leonard. His brother was named Kallman. His parents were both Jewish. He went to New York University in which he played football. Shortly after he graduated from New York University, he was drafted into the military where he served during the Second World War. He was a pilot and instructor in the United States Navy.

Career
After World War II, in 1946 Leonard moved to Hollywood and became an independent producer. Leonard's first credit as producer was the movie Conquest in Cochise in 1953. He soon became production manager for Screen Gems, the television subsidiary of Columbia Pictures where he produced several memorable programs for the company. His early television producing projects included The Adventures of Rin Tin Tin, which ran from 1954 to 1959, and Circus Boy. Rin Tin Tin became an instant. hit with children. The series also made a western star and a pet of a German shepherd character originally featured in movies after World War I. Circus Boy revolved around a boy named Corky raised by a clown and his family.

After Circus Boy ended its run in 1957, Leonard moved on to more serious shows. Leonard became a household name when Naked City premiered on ABC Television the next year. Naked City, adapted from the 1948 movie The Naked City, aired for five seasons from 1958 to 1963. The episodes, which followed two fictional New York City detectives, were shot on location throughout New York City, something that was rarely done for television in the 1960s, and its stark urban realism sometimes approached that of cinéma vérité.

Route 66 which began in 1960 on CBS, followed two men in a Chevrolet Corvette around the United States. Each week, until the series ended in 1964, they encountered a different town and a different story. It was also shot on location around the United States in about 25 states, although only occasionally on the actual Route 66. A romance of the road that emphasized a sense of rootlessness, it stood out from many of the dramas and situation comedies that were its contemporaries.

Leonard also produced several films. Among Leonard's movie credits are Popi, a 1969 comedy-drama directed by Arthur Hiller and starring Alan Arkin. Leonard also produced and co-directed The Perils of Pauline, a 1967 comedy starring Pat Boone; and he produced and directed Going Home, a 1971 drama starring Robert Mitchum. Leonard retired from show business in 1993.

Personal life
Herbert B. Leonard was married four times and had six daughters. His first wife Willetta Smith (1925–2001) was Leonard's production assistant on both Naked City and Route 66. He had six daughters; Gina, Michelle, Swan, Victoria, Sophie and Annie, with his second wife Jenny. His fourth wife and widow was Betty Kennedy, an actress known for her role as a celebrity panelist on Match Game PM. His daughters Annie and Gina are also producers.

Leonard was diagnosed with throat cancer in 2003. He lost his larynx and eventually the ability to speak due to the disease. Leonard succumbed to the disease and died in his Los Angeles home on October 14, 2006, six days after his 84th birthday. Along with his wife Betty and his daughters, Leonard was survived by three grandchildren. A memorial service was held for Leonard on October 20 at the Old North Church inside Forest Lawn – Hollywood Hills in Hollywood Hills, California where he was buried.

References

External links

1922 births
2006 deaths
American film producers
American television producers
Deaths from cancer in California
Deaths from throat cancer
Jewish American military personnel
New York University alumni
Screen Gems
20th-century American Jews
21st-century American Jews